Pleasure Bay is a tributary of the Shrewsbury River in Monmouth County, New Jersey in the United States.

Pleasure Bay is an estuary formed by the confluence of Branchport Creek and Troutmans Creek, flowing north to the Shrewsbury River. A short distance above the mouth, Manahasset Creek enters the bay.

Pleasure Bay forms the boundary of Oceanport with Long Branch and Monmouth Beach.

Tributaries
 Branchport Creek
 Troutmans Creek
 Manahasset Creek

See also
 List of rivers of New Jersey

External links
 U.S. Geological Survey: NJ stream gaging stations

Bodies of water of Monmouth County, New Jersey
Rivers of New Jersey
Estuaries of New Jersey